Carl Fearns (born 28 May 1989 in Liverpool, England) is a rugby union player for Newcastle Falcons in Premiership Rugby. He plays as a back-row forward.

Fearns made his Sale debut in an EDF Energy Cup match against Cardiff Blues, winning the Man of the Match award.

Fearns captained England at U18 level. He was a member of the England Under 20 team that reached the final of the 2009 IRB Junior World Championship.
His performances in this tournament led to him being nominated for the IRB Junior Player of the Year award.

Fearns missed the whole of the 2007–08 season due to knee reconstruction.

It was announced on 8 March 2011 that Fearns had signed for Bath on a 2-year deal.

On 10 July 2013, Fearns knocked out Bath teammate Gavin Henson on a night out in the city.

On 7 November 2016, Fearns made Sky Sports Team of the Week after a season defining performance for Lyon against Toulon.

On 19 May 2020, it was confirmed that Fearns would stay in France as he signed for Rouen in the second-level Pro D2 from the 2020-21 season.

He left Rouen to join Premiership Rugby side Newcastle Falcons on a two-year deal in April 2021.

References

External links
Sale Sharks profile
England profile
Guinness Premiership profile

1989 births
Living people
Bath Rugby players
English rugby union players
People educated at Sedbergh School
Rugby union players from Liverpool
Sale Sharks players
Rugby union flankers